The Bukit Panjang Single Member Constituency is a Single Member Constituency (SMC) located in the western area of Singapore. The current Member of Parliament for the constituency is from the  People's Action Party (PAP) Liang Eng Hwa.

History
The seat consists the main portion of Bukit Panjang (Blks 101-129, 2xx and 4xx Fajar) and was reformed in the 2006 electoral boundary redraw. Bukit Panjang SMC existed from 1959 to 1991 when it was absorbed into the Sembawang Group Representation Constituency (GRC). In 2001, the seat was moved from Sembawang GRC to Holland–Bukit Panjang GRC. The 2006 redrawn boundaries carved out Bukit Panjang to form the current constituency and the GRC was renamed Holland–Bukit Timah GRC. In the 2020 Singapore general election, PAP's Liang defeated Singapore Democratic Party's Paul Tambyah by a narrow margin of 2,509 votes and it was the closest result in a SMC for that election.

Town Council 
Bukit Panjang SMC, along with Holland-Bukit Timah GRC, is managed by the Holland–Bukit Timah Town Council.

Members of Parliament

Electoral results

Elections in 1950s

Elections in 1960s

Elections in 1970s

Elections in 1980s

Elections in 2000s

Elections in 2010s

Elections in 2020s

Historical maps

References

External links 
2020 General Election's result
2011 General Election's result
2006 General Election's result
1988 General Election's result
1984 General Election's result
1980 General Election's result
1976 General Election's result
1972 General Election's result
1968 General Election's result
1967 By-Election's result
1963 General Election's result
1959 General Election's result
Parliamentary General Election results(Govtech Data)

Singaporean electoral divisions
Bukit Panjang